Benjamín Ignacio Galdames Millán (born 24 February 2001) is a Mexican professional footballer who plays as a midfielder for Chilean Primera División club Unión Española.

International career

Youth
In October 2020, Galdames received his first ever call up to the Mexico national under-20 team by Raúl Chabrand for training camp.

On 9 October 2021, Galdames made his Mexico under-21 debut in a friendly match against the Romania U21 side. He was called up by Raúl Chabrand to participate with the under-21 team at the 2022 Maurice Revello Tournament, where Mexico finished the tournament in third place.

Senior
In December 2021, Galdames was included in the Mexico national team call-up by Gerardo Martino for a friendly match against Chile set to take place on December 8. He had also been called up for Chile by the coach Martín Lasarte, but he rejected that chance.

Career statistics

Club

Personal life
Galdames is the son of Chilean former international footballer Pablo Galdames. He was born in Mexico City due to his father being a Cruz Azul player at the time. Due to the fact that he holds dual Mexican-Chilean nationality, he can play for the Chile national team as well as the Mexico national team.

From his paternal line, he is the younger brother of the Chilean footballers Pablo Jr. and Thomas and the half-brother of the also footballer Mathías. In addition, through his maternal line, he and his brothers are related to the Spanish footballer Nerea Sánchez Millán.

References

External links
 

2001 births
Living people
Association football midfielders
Mexican footballers
Sportspeople of Chilean descent
Mexico youth international footballers
Mexican people of Chilean descent
Citizens of Chile through descent
Naturalized citizens of Chile
Chilean footballers
Chilean Primera División players
Unión Española footballers
Expatriate footballers in Chile